Cabaret Cruise is a live variety programme series broadcast 193739, 1946 and 1949 on BBC Television. It was one of several spin-offs from the BBC series Cabaret. Its distinctive feature was that it was set on the fictional ship RMS Sunshine, constructed in the studio. All 15 episodes were presented by British naval officer and broadcaster Commander Campbell and produced by Harry Pringle.

An episode had been planned for October 1939; it was not broadcast, because BBC Television suspended operations with the outbreak of World War II on 1 September 1939. In 1940, Pringle relocated to Australia. He was in England 194647 between spells of employment at the Australian Broadcasting Corporation, and in 1949 on leave of absence, and produced episodes on both occasions.

No episodes have survived.

Performers 
Performers (number of episodes given in parentheses) included:

 Dick Bentley (190795), Australia-born comedian (1) 
 The Beverley Sisters, vocal and light entertainment trio (2) 
 Buddy Bradley (190572), choreographer (1) 
 Commander Campbell (18811966), compere (15) 
 Florence Desmond (190593), English comedian (1) 
 Steven Geray (190473), Hungarian-born actor (4) 
 Leslie Henson (18911957), English comedian (1) 
 Charles Heslop (18831966), actor (1) 
 Jack Jackson (190678), trumpeter and bandleader (1) 
 Jean Kent (19212013), British actress (1) 

 Magda Kun (191245), Hungarian-born actress (4) 
 Eve Lister (191397), British actress (1) 
 Joy Nichols (192592), Australian-born comedian (1) 
 Irene Prador (191196), Austrian-born actress (1) 
 George Robey (18691954), English comedian (1) 
 Eric Robinson (190874) and His Boat Deck Boys, musicians (3) 
 Ernest Shannon, impressionist (5) 
 The Ship's Band, musicians (8) 
 Edwin Styles (18991960), actor (2) 
 Jack Train (190266), British film actor (1)

See also 
 Cabaret (British TV series)
 Cabaret Cartoons
 Comedy Cabaret
 Eastern Cabaret
 Intimate Cabaret
 Western Cabaret

Notes

References

External links
 
 

1930s British television series
1940s British television series
1937 British television series debuts
1949 British television series endings
Lost BBC episodes
BBC Television shows
Black-and-white British television shows
British variety television shows